Portarlington was a rotten borough and is a former United Kingdom Parliament constituency, in Ireland, returning one MP. It was an original constituency represented in Parliament when the Union of Great Britain and Ireland took effect on 1 January 1801.

Boundaries
This constituency was the parliamentary borough of Portarlington in Queen's County, now called County Laois.

Members of Parliament

Elections

Elections in the 1830s

Elections in the 1840s

Dawson-Damer was appointed Comptroller of the Household, requiring a by-election.

Elections in the 1850s
Dunne was appointed Clerk of the Ordnance, requiring a by-election.

Elections in the 1860s

Elections in the 1870s

Elections in the 1880s

FitzPatrick succeeded to the peerage, becoming Lord Castletown, causing a by-election.

See also
 Portarlington (Parliament of Ireland constituency)

References

The Parliaments of England by Henry Stooks Smith (1st edition published in three volumes 1844–50), 2nd edition edited (in one volume) by F.W.S. Craig (Political Reference Publications 1973)

Historic constituencies in County Laois
Historic constituencies in County Offaly
Portarlington
Portarlington
Constituencies of the Parliament of the United Kingdom established in 1801
Constituencies of the Parliament of the United Kingdom disestablished in 1885
Portarlington, County Laois
Rotten boroughs